Robert Giardinelli (January 23, 1914 in Catania, Italy – October 1, 1996 in New York City, New York) was a noted musical instrument craftsman who operated a musical instrument repair shop in New York City. After immigrating to the United States, Giardinelli served in the United States Army during World War II. Starting in the Bronx in 1946, he later moved his music shop to midtown Manhattan, where he remained in business for over 40 years until his retirement. Giardinelli's business included musical mouthpiece manufacturing, a discount retail music store, and a custom repair shop for brass and wind instruments. Giardinelli's music shop was located on the upper floors at 151 West 46th Street. His business became a world-renowned stop for musicians during the 1980s.

He completed his biography three days before his death in 1996.  Giardinelli's shop at 151 W. 46th Street (upstairs) is now occupied by Jon Baltimore Music serving a similar function of selling and repairing musical instruments. With the departure of Sam Ash Music in 2012, Jon Baltimore is the last musical repairman operating a shop open to the general public in the Times Square business area.

References

Musical instrument retailers of the United States
American musical instrument makers
1914 births
1996 deaths
Italian emigrants to the United States